The 1926 Eden by-election was a by-election for the Eden electorate during the 22nd New Zealand Parliament. The seat became vacant after the appointment of the sitting member, James Parr of the Reform Party as High Commissioner to London. Parr resigned on 26 March. Labour won the by-election and became the official opposition in Parliament.

Background
The by-election was held on 15 April 1926. Three candidates contested the seat. James Gunson the official Reform candidate had been Mayor of Auckland from 1915 to 1925. Ellen Melville stood as an "Independent" Reform candidate, claiming interference by the party organiser Albert Davy prevented her being selected as the official candidate. The Reform Party vote was split allowing the Labour candidate, Rex Mason, to win. The Liberal Party was "so weak .... that they could not field a candidate.

Labour's candidate in Eden from the previous general election, Rex Mason was successful in winning the party nomination. The three others who vied for the candidacy were Frank Langstone (former MP for Waimarino), Tom Bloodworth (an Auckland City Councillor) and Jim Purtell (secretary of the Auckland Glassworkers' Union).

Gunson was expected to "romp home" in the by-election; Reform had 55 seats. But with the Liberals having 11 seats plus two Liberal-leaning independents and Labour 12, Labour realised their chance to be the official Opposition and "threw their all" into their contest; helped by Melville standing as Independent Reform. "Never before or since have people in the sprawling electorate stretching from Eden Park, through Mount Albert, Pt Chevalier, New Lynn, Te Atatu, Massey and Hobsonville been wooed as assiduously as they were in March and April 1926" with party leaders Coates and Holland spending days in the electorate.

As a result of Labour's candidate Rex Mason winning the by-election, Labour became the second largest party in Parliament and Harry Holland became Leader of the Opposition on 16 June 1926.

Result
The following table gives the election results:

Results by locality
Following table showcasts the detailed results by locality for the ballot:

Notes

References

Eden 1926
1926 elections in New Zealand
Politics of the Auckland Region
1920s in Auckland